John Lewis Peck (July 6, 1857 – January 14, 1927) was a Canadian politician. He served in the Legislative Assembly of New Brunswick as member of the Albert party representing Albert County from 1917 to 1927.

References

20th-century Canadian politicians
1857 births
1927 deaths
Progressive Conservative Party of New Brunswick MLAs